Freedom Forum is a nonpartisan foundation dedicated to free press and free speech.

Freedom Forum may also refer to:

Free Forum, a political party in Slovakia
Oslo Freedom Forum, a series of global conferences run by the Human Rights Foundation

See also
Fourth Freedom Forum, a nonpartisan foundation concerned with global security threats
Five Freedoms Forum, a former group of anti-apartheid organizations